You Can't Take It with You is an American sitcom television series produced for syndication in 1986,. It was based on the 1938 film adaptation of the 1937 play by the same name.

Set in a contemporaneous home in Staten Island, the show starred Harry Morgan as the eccentric elderly family patriarch Martin Vanderhof, and Lois Nettleton as his daughter, Penny. The cast also included Richard Sanders as Penny's inventor-husband Paul, Lisa Aliff as Penny's older daughter, Alice, and Heather Blodgett (Elizabeth Townsend in the pilot) as Penny's younger daughter, Essie. Theodore Wilson appeared as neighbor Durwood Pinner.

Although only four episodes were broadcast, 22 episodes were filmed.  some episodes are available to watch on various content streaming services. One review of the show noted that the play from which the material for the show was originally adapted "will be remembered long after this routine comedy is not".

Cast
Harry Morgan as Martin Vanderhof
Lisa Aliff as Alice Sycamore
Richard Sanders as Paul Sycamore
Lois Nettleton as Penny Vanderhof Sycamore
Heather Blodgett as Essie Sycamore
Theodore Wilson as Darwood Pinner

Episodes
The following four episodes were the only ones broadcast in syndication.

Syndication
You Can't Take It with You was a part of a syndication package that was conceived by NBC for its owned-and-operated stations. Five sitcoms each aired once a week under the brand "Prime Time Begins at 7:30", and were produced by various production companies contracted by NBC. Besides  You Can't Take It With You, which aired on Wednesdays, the series included Marblehead Manor (from Paramount Television, airing Mondays), centering on a mansion owner and the people who live with him; She's the Sheriff (from Lorimar-Telepictures and airing Tuesdays), a comeback vehicle for Suzanne Somers which cast her as a widowed county sheriff; Out of This World (from MCA Television and airing Thursdays), which starred Maureen Flannigan as a teenager born to an alien father and human mother that develops supernatural abilities on her 13th birthday; and a revival of the short-lived 1983 NBC series We Got It Made (produced by Fred Silverman for MGM Television and closing out the week on Fridays), as part of an ongoing trend at the time in which former network series were revived in first-run syndication.

The package was aimed at attracting viewers to NBC stations in the half-hour preceding prime time (8:00 p.m. in the Eastern and Pacific Time Zones, 7:00 p.m. elsewhere), and was conceived as a result of the FCC's loosening of the Prime Time Access Rule, legislation passed in 1971 that required networks to turn over the 7:30 p.m. (Eastern) time slot to local stations to program local or syndicated content; and the relaxation of the Financial Interest and Syndication Rules, which had prevented networks from producing content from their own syndication units to fill the void. The shows that were part of the package were regularly outrated in many markets by such syndicated game shows as Wheel of Fortune, Jeopardy! and Hollywood Squares. Marblehead Manor, We Got It Made and You Can't Take It With You were cancelled at the end of the 1987–88 season, with She's the Sheriff lasting one more season in weekend syndication before its cancellation. Out of This World ran for three additional seasons, airing mainly on weekends, and was the most successful of the five series.

References

External links
 

1987 American television series debuts
1988 American television series endings
1980s American sitcoms
English-language television shows
Television series based on plays
First-run syndicated television programs in the United States
Television shows set in New York (state)